The New South Wales Department of Finance, Services and Innovation, was a department of the Government of New South Wales that, until its 2019 abolition, functioned as a service provider to support sustainable government finances, major public works and maintenance programs, government procurement, information and communications technology, corporate and shared services, consumer protection, administration of taxation and revenue collection, and land and property administration of the government in New South Wales, Australia.

The department was previously known as the Department of Finance and Services (DFS) between April 2011 and April 2014, and the Office of Finance and Services between April 2014 and July 2015.

Following the 2019 state election most of the functions of the department were transferred to the newly-formed Department of Customer Service, with some functions transferred to The Treasury, with effect from 1 July 2019.

Structure and responsibilities
Up until its abolition, the chief executive officer, entitled Secretary, of the Department was Martin Hoffman. The Department was responsible to the Minister for Finance, Services and Property, Victor Dominello and the Minister for Innovation and Better Regulation, Matt Kean. Both ministers were ultimately responsible to the Parliament of New South Wales.

The divisions of the department included:

Corporate Services
Government Services
OneGov
Land, Property and Housing
Office of Registrar General (monitor and enforce performance of the NSW Land Registry Services)
Property NSW
Teacher Housing Authority
Waste Assets Management Corporation
 Legal Audit & Risk
NSW Public Works
NSW Fair Trading
 Office of Finance
Revenue NSW
Property and Housing Group
 State Archives & Records
Work, Health and Safety
Insurance & Care NSW
State Insurance Regulatory Authority
SafeWork NSW
Service Innovation and Strategy
Service NSW
SICorp
 Telco Authority

References

External links
NSW Department of Finance and Services webpage
 of NSW Fair Trading

Finance, Services and Innovation
Economy of New South Wales
2019 disestablishments in Australia
Government agencies disestablished in 2019